Stuart Beattie (born 4 August 1971) is an Australian filmmaker. His screenplay for Collateral (2004) earned him nominations for the BAFTA Award for Best Original Screenplay, Satellite Award for Best Original Screenplay and Saturn Award for Best Writing.

Beattie was born in Melbourne and raised in Sydney. He attended Knox Grammar School in Sydney, where his mother, Sandra, was a languages teacher; and later Charles Sturt University in Bathurst.

Filmography

Film

Uncredited rewrites
 The Messengers (2007)
 Punisher: War Zone (2008)

Television

Awards and nominations

References

External links

Stuart Beattie judged The Film of the Month competition in March 2009 on the independent filmmakers networking site Shooting People.
Interview With Stuart Beattie | The Rip It Up Music Website

1971 births
Living people
21st-century Australian male writers
21st-century Australian screenwriters
Action film directors
Australian film directors
Australian film producers
Australian male screenwriters
Charles Sturt University alumni
People educated at Knox Grammar School
Film directors from Melbourne
Writers from Melbourne